Tewar may refer to:

 Places

 Tewar, Madhya Pradesh, a village in India
 Tewar, Punjab, a village in India

People

 Divya Tewar, Indian judoka